The Netherlands competed at the 2012 Summer Olympics in London, United Kingdom, from 27 July to 12 August 2012. Dutch athletes have competed in every Summer Olympic Games since their official debut in 1908, with the exception of the 1956 Summer Olympics in Melbourne, which the Netherlands boycotted because of the Soviet invasion of Hungary. The Netherlands National Olympic Committee (NOC*NSF) sent the nation's smallest delegation to the Games since 1988. A total of 175 athletes, 95 men and 80 women, competed in 18 sports.

The Netherlands left London with a total of 20 Olympic medals (6 gold, 6 silver, and 8 bronze), finishing thirteenth in the overall medal standings. Four of these medals were awarded to the team in swimming and equestrian, and three each in cycling and sailing. Four Dutch athletes won more than a single Olympic medal in London. The Netherlands proved successful in team sports in London, as the men's and women's national field hockey teams won gold and silver medals, respectively. For the first time in its history, Netherlands won an Olympic medal in BMX cycling.

Among the nation's medalists were cyclist Marianne Vos, who took her second gold medal, this time in women's road race, windsurfer Dorian van Rijsselberghe, who became the second Dutch man to claim an Olympic title since 1984, and gymnast Epke Zonderland, who won the Netherlands' first ever gold medal in his sport after 84 years. Anky van Grunsven, who won bronze in London, emerged as the greatest equestrian rider in Olympic history, with a total of nine medals (three of them gold). Meanwhile, Ranomi Kromowidjojo became one of the most successful Dutch swimmers in history, with a total of four Olympic medals (including two golds in London), and three Olympic records.

Medalists

| width="78%" align="left" valign="top" |

| width="22%" align="left" valign="top" |

Competitors
NOC*NSF selected a team of 175 athletes (exclusive reserves), 95 men and 80 women, to compete in 18 sports; it was the nation's eighth-largest team sent to the Olympics, but the smallest since 1988. Field hockey was the only team-based sport in which the Netherlands had its representation in these Olympic games. There was only a single competitor in archery, badminton, fencing, shooting, and taekwondo.

The Dutch team featured three defending Olympic champions (dressage rider Anky van Grunsven, the women's freestyle swimming team, and the women's national field hockey team). Van Grunsven, eight-time medalist and the oldest member of the team, at age 44, became the first Dutch female athlete to compete in seven Olympic games. Beach volleyballer Richard Schuil was at his fifth appearance, having participated in the Olympics since the sport's introduction in 1996. Meanwhile, gymnast Céline van Gerner, at age 17, was the youngest athlete of the team. Windsurfer Dorian van Rijsselberghe, who claimed seven World cup titles and a single world championship title for his event, became the Netherlands' flag bearer at the opening ceremony.

Among the Dutch athletes in the team, several of them were born outside the Netherlands. Sprinter Churandy Martina played for two of his previous Olympics under the Netherlands Antilles, which was dissolved in 2010. Two other athletes competed for their respective nations before representing the Netherlands: table tennis player Elena Timina, who made her first two Olympic appearances under the Unified Team and Russia, and field hockey player Marilyn Agliotti, who played for the South African team in Sydney.

Other notable Dutch athletes featured gymnast Epke Zonderland, who called himself "The Flying Dutchman" for his astonishing display in the men's horizontal bar exercises, swimmer and world short course champion Ranomi Kromowidjojo, judokas Edith Bosch and Elisabeth Willeboordse, who both previously won the bronze medal in Beijing, and cyclist Marianne Vos, a former Olympic champion who later competed in the women's road race.

The following is the list of number of competitors participating in the Games:

Archery

Netherlands has qualified the following archers.

Athletics

Dutch athletes have so far achieved qualifying standards in the following athletics events (up to a maximum of 3 athletes in each event at the 'A' Standard, and 1 at the 'B' Standard):

Men
Track & road events

* Wouter Brus and Jerrel Feller were reserves for the 4 × 100 m relay, but did not compete.

Field events

Combined events – Decathlon

Women
Track & road events

* Esther Akihary and Marit Dopheide were reserves for the 4 × 100 m relay, but did not compete.

Field events

Combined events – Heptathlon

Badminton

Cycling

Netherlands has so far qualified cyclists for the following events.

Road
Men

Women

Track
Sprint

Team sprint

Pursuit

Keirin

Omnium

Mountain biking

BMX

Equestrian

Dressage

Eventing

Jumping

Fencing

Netherlands has qualified 1 fencer.

Men

Field hockey

Men's tournament

Group play

Semi-final

Final

Women's tournament

Roster

Group play

Semi-final

Final

Gymnastics

Artistic
Men

Women

Trampoline

Judo

Netherlands has qualified 9 judokas

Men

Women

Rowing

The following quota place has been qualified for the Netherlands rowing squad at the Games 

Men

Women

Qualification Legend: FA=Final A (medal); FB=Final B (non-medal); FC=Final C (non-medal); FD=Final D (non-medal); FE=Final E (non-medal); FF=Final F (non-medal); SA/B=Semifinals A/B; SC/D=Semifinals C/D; SE/F=Semifinals E/F; QF=Quarterfinals; R=Repechage

Sailing

Netherlands has qualified 1 boat for each of the following events

Men

Women

M = Medal race; EL = Eliminated – did not advance into the medal race;

Match racing

Shooting

The following quota place has been qualified for the Netherlands shooting squad at the Games;

Men

Swimming

Dutch swimmers have achieved qualifying standards in the following events (up to a maximum of 2 swimmers in each event at the Olympic Qualifying Time (OQT), and 1 at the Olympic Selection Time (OST)):

Men

Women

Table tennis

Netherlands has qualified a women's team.

Taekwondo

Netherlands has qualified 1 athlete.

Tennis

Triathlon

Netherlands has qualified the following athletes.

Volleyball

Beach

Sponsors

National house

The Holland Heineken House in Alexandra Palace was the Dutch meeting place for supporters, athletes and other followers during the 2012 Summer Olympics in London. The Holland Heineken House opened their doors at the day of the opening ceremony on 27 July 2012 and closed on the day of the closing ceremony, 12 August 2012. All Dutch medalists, including the women's road cycling squad (Ellen van Dijk, Loes Gunnewijk and Annemiek van Vleuten) and the belonging coaches, were honoured in Holland Heineken House. Due to the expected numbers of visitors, tickets had to be bought in advance. With about six thousand visitors per day, over one hundred thousand visitors visited the Dutch national home during the Games.

Clothes
Suitsupply was the official supplier of the 2012 Dutch Olympic team. and was awarded best Olympic outfit by multiple websites, among which was Yahoo Sports.

References

Nations at the 2012 Summer Olympics
2012
Summer Olympics